Meite or Meité is a surname. Notable people with the surname include:

Soualiho Meïté (born 1994), French footballer
Abdoulaye Méïté (born 1980), French born Ivorian former footballer
Yakou Méïté (born 1996), French born Ivorian footballer currently playing for Championship side Reading FC
Amadou Meïté (1949–2014), sprinter from Côte d'Ivoire
Ben Youssef Meïté (born 1986), sprinter from Côte d'Ivoire
Ibrahim Meité (born 1976), Côte d'Ivoire sprinter who specializes in the 100 and 200 metres
Maé Bérénice Méité (born 1994), French figure skater